Clop is fan-made pornography or erotic art, fan fiction, fan films, fangames, ‎and other fan labor based on the animated series My Little Pony: Friendship Is Magic and My Little Pony: Equestria Girls and further generations of said franchise. It first appeared in 2010, very shortly after the show first aired.

Etymology
The word "clop" itself is a pun or wordplay based on the slang word "fap." The word is also used as a verb, to refer to masturbating as "clopping." Other related terms include clop-fic for erotic fiction/slash fiction centered around My Little Pony characters, and clopper for a person who enjoys this type of material.

History 
Considered to be either a subset of brony fandom, furry fandom, or both, My Little Pony-inspired erotic fan art reportedly first began appearing on the web around 2012. Most of the fanfiction stories are focused on romance between the characters rather than titillation. When compared to other fandoms' fan art, the Friendship Is Magic fan art more prominently features homosexual ships. The topic has received scholarly attention. To some in the fandom, "clopping" (masturbating to clop) is frowned upon. On the other hand, in 2015, The Guardian reported that in the Brony community on 4chan, having sex with a real person was seen as a negative, and not clopping as a form of heresy. The most popular character in My Little Pony-related pornography is Rainbow Dash, followed by Rarity and Pinkie Pie.

Demographics and geography 
According to internal studies, 19.05% of bronies have engaged in clopping, but it is assumed that the percentage is actually larger. A different survey by Pornhub revealed that most participants are millennials aging from 16 to 24 years old and that men are 37% more likely to search for My Little Pony-related pornography than women.

While most of the My Little Pony fandom is located in the United States and United Kingdom, most My Little Pony-related pornography is watched in Slavic Europe, with Belarus, Russia, Ukraine, and the Czech Republic being the top four.

Reception 
Baltimore Sun journalist Gianna Decarlo condemned erotic art as one of the problems of the My Little Pony fandom, as it became an "unstoppable force of sexual deviancy" and that "not even a simple Google search is safe." EJ Dickson of the Daily Dot wrote that enjoyers of the erotic art are "black sheep in the community," meaning that the rest of the brony fandom fears that cloppers will give the whole fandom a bad name.

See also 
 Cartoon pornography
 Doujinshi
 Overwatch and pornography
 Rule 34
 Tijuana bible
 Yiff

References 

2010s in art
2010s neologisms
2020s in art
4chan phenomena
Computer-related introductions in 2012
Erotic art
Fan labor
Furry fandom
My Little Pony: Friendship Is Magic
My Little Pony fandom
Pornographic animation